Velunatchi is a 2018 Tamil Language soap opera starring V. J. Chitra, Manikandan.  It aired on Colors Tamil from 20 February 2018 to 26 July 2018.

The series marks Manikandan's first small screen role since 2014. It is a story of a young girl Velunatchi (V. J. Chitra) who transforms herself into a strong woman carrying her father's lineage. It is a first soap opera about Silambam.

Overview 
Velunaachi's father was a silambam artist. He was everything to her. When he became physically challenged after an incident she takes care of him.

Cast
 V. J. Chitra  as Velunachi 
 Manikandan Rajesh as Arul
S.Kavitha

References

External links
 Colors Tamil Official Youtube Channel in Tamil

Colors Tamil original programming
Tamil-language martial arts television series
Tamil-language sports television series
2010s Tamil-language television series
2018 Tamil-language television series debuts
Tamil-language television shows
2018 Tamil-language television series endings
Indian sports television series